Helianthus navarri is a species of sunflower in the family Asteraceae. It is native to Chile in South America.

References

navarri
Flora of Chile
Plants described in 1895